In Bed by Eight (German: ...und sowas muß um acht ins Bett) is a 1965 Austrian-West German black-and-white musical comedy film directed by Werner Jacobs and starring Peter Alexander, Gitte Hænning and Ingeborg Schöner.

It was shot at the Rosenhügel Studios in Vienna. The film's sets were designed by the art director Fritz Jüptner-Jonstorff.

Synopsis
A teacher at a boarding school in the Carinthian mountains has to tackle with an extremely difficult class. Led by the troublesome Princess Margaret they write fake love letters from him to his female colleague, eventually launching a romance between them.

Cast
 Peter Alexander as Dr. Eduard Frank
 Gitte Hænning as Prinzessin Margaret
 Ingeborg Schöner as Angelika Weiß
 Gunther Philipp as Dr. Arthur Schäfer
 Loni Heuser as Frau Dr. Diehlmann
 Lotte Lang as Frau Dr. Schwabe
  as Direktor Rieger
  as Fräulein Bichler
 Elisabeth Stiepl as Fräulein Hampel
 Gisela Hahn as Ines
 Rudolf Vogel as Hofrat Andersen

References

Bibliography 
 Von Dassanowsky, Robert. Austrian Cinema: A History. McFarland, 2005.

External links

1965 films
West German films
1960s German-language films
Films directed by Werner Jacobs
1965 musical comedy films
German musical comedy films
Austrian musical comedy films
Films about educators
Films set in Austria
German black-and-white films
Films shot at Rosenhügel Studios
Constantin Film films
1960s German films